Bright Flight is the fourth studio album by indie rock group Silver Jews, released in 2001.

"Tennessee" was chosen as the title track for an EP that also included "Long Long Gone", "I'm Gonna Love The Hell Out of You", and "Turn Your Guns Around".

Critical reception
The Guardian wrote: "Fusing gorgeous, tear-sodden country melodies with lyrics that inspire love and anxiety in equal measure, Bright Flight poetically captures a drunken night spent contemplating suicide while staring at the Nashville skyline." The Stranger wrote that "the stories told and the places visited are rich with radiant imagery--not always happy, but encouraging in their pure, honest existence." Trouser Press wrote that the album "is not, on the whole, as agreeably encompassing as American Water, it is the work of an artist increasingly able to get to the emotional heart of a song without relying on the crutches of irony and overt cleverness."

Track listing

Personnel
Musicians
 David Berman - lead vocals, guitar
 Cassie Berman - vocals on "Slow Education", "Let's Not and Say We Did", and "Tennessee", bass
 William Tyler - guitar, vocals on "Let's Not and Say We Did"
 Mike Fellows - bass
 Tim Barnes - drums, percussion
 Paul Niehaus - pedal steel guitar
 Tony Crow - piano, organ, electric piano, synthesizer, vocals on "Let's Not and Say We Did" and "Friday Night Fever"

Additional Personnel
 Hilary Small - artwork
 Mark Nevers - engineer, producer
 Mike Fellows - assistant producer

References

2001 albums
Silver Jews albums
Drag City (record label) albums